Holoscenic is the fourth studio album released by Canadian producer Rhys Fulber as Conjure One, the first album for Armada Music. The album was initially released as a worldwide digital download on November 20, 2015.

Overview
The album had two singles ahead of its release. First out in April 2013 was the song "Under the Gun" featuring vocals by Leigh Nash, which also featured a remix by Rank 1 and the first music video for Conjure One, shot in Iowa and Tennessee. The second single, "Still Holding On" (released in September 2013), featured vocals by Aruna and remixes by Arisen Flame, Clinton Van Sciver, Mike Shiver and well as a chillout mix by Aruna and Rhys Fulber.

About the album, Fulber said, "I had been thinking about the concept of the Holocene epoch for a while - the ruins of civilization that a decaying society leaves behind to be once again consumed by nature. The word itself is a bit dry and one day the word play just came together and was written down to be rediscovered a couple years later as this album took shape. It then seemed like the perfect title for this collection of songs, and directly inspired the artwork which perfectly conveys the feeling of the music."

Track listing

Personnel

Conjure One
 Rhys Fulber – production, mixing, programming

Additional musicians
 Hannah Ray – vocals (1)
 Deniz Reno – vocals (2)
 Chris Elliott – string arrangement (2)
 Leigh Nash – vocals (3)
 Emerson Swinford – guitar (3)
 Stevie Blacke – strings (3, 7), string arrangement (3, 7)
 Leah Randi – vocals (4)
 Christian Burns – vocals (5)
 Matt Lange – guitar (5, 10, 11), additional programming (1, 8, 11)
 Aruna – vocals (7)
 Kristy Thirsk – vocals (8)
 Joel Shearer – guitar (8)
 Kerli – backing vocals (8)
 Jeza – vocals (10)
 Mimi Page – vocals (11)

Technical personnel
 Greg Reely – mastering, mixing (1, 3, 8)
 Michał Karcz – cover art, design
 John Rummen – Conjure One logo

Charts

References

2015 albums
Armada Music albums
Conjure One albums
Chill-out music albums